Infantry Training Centre may refer to:

Infantry Training Centre (British Army)
Infantry Training Centre (Sri Lanka Army)

See also
 School of Infantry